United Flow is the twelfth studio album by Japanese singer Toshinobu Kubota, released on April 10, 2002. The album sold over 68,000 units in Japan.

Release and the charts 

It was released in 2002 on Columbia Records.

It charted pretty high on the Billboard chart in Japan when it came out, reaching number 6 on the albums chart. The album charted at number 9 on the Oricon Albums chart and remained on the charts for 5 weeks.

Track listing
 "United Flow (Foreplay)"
 "Go"
 "無常"
 "Do Me Baby"
 "Respect (This & That) (Extended Funky Jam Version)"
 "#My Bad"
 "Heaven?"
 "United Flow (Replay)"
 "Because of U"
 "Free Your Soul"
 "Moonstruck"
 "Candy Rain"
 "In Your Flow (Eternal Flow Version)"

References

2002 albums
Toshinobu Kubota albums
Sony Music albums